Juan Geerman (born June 19, 1970) is an Aruban football player. He played for the Aruba national team in 1996.

References

1970 births
Living people
Aruban footballers
Association football defenders
Aruba international footballers